The Briard or  plural: Bergers de Brie}} is a French breed of large shepherd dog, traditionally used both for herding sheep and to defend them.

History 

The Briard originated in, and is named for, the Brie historic region of north-central France, where it was traditionally used both for herding sheep and to defend them. The first written mention of the shepherd dogs of Brie is thought to be in the Cours complet d'agriculture of Jean-Baptiste François Rozier, who in 1783 wrote that the "chien de Brie" was long-haired and usually black; that in the open plains there was little danger from wolves, and so the dogs were used more for herding than for defence; and that shepherd dogs had the task of preventing the sheep from straying into crops or vineyards where they might cause damage. Pierre Mégnin, writing in 1895, clearly distinguishes the short-haired Chien de Beauce – the modern Beauceron – from the long-haired Chien de Brie or Briard.

The Berger de Brie was first shown at the first Paris dog show in 1863, where a bitch named Charmant took a prize. A breed standard was established in 1897, in which two varieties were described: one with a woolly or sheep-like coat, the other with a coat more similar to that of the goat; the woolly type later disappeared. In 1909, a breed society, Les Amis du Briard, was formed.

Breed numbers fell during the First World War; any dog thought suitable for military use was sent to the front. The breed society resumed its activities in 1923, and a rival breed association was formed at about the same time; in 1935, this last organised the first single-breed show for the Berger de Brie, with seventy-eight participants. Numbers again fell sharply under the Nazi occupation of France during the Second World War. After the war the two breed clubs merged under the name Club des Amis du Briard.

In 1954, the Berger de Brie was fully recognised by the Fédération Cynologique Internationale.

Partly as a consequence of the mechanisation of agriculture and resulting rural depopulation of the post-War years, the Berger de Brie came to be commonly kept as a companion dog. In the 1970s and 1980s, its numbers increased substantially: annual registrations in the Livre des Origines Françaises rose from 317 in 1970 to 905 in 1975, to 4101 in 1980 and then to a peak of 6364 in 1986, after which they fell precipitously; at one point the breed club had over 6000 members, more than any other French breed association at any time.

In 2001, blindness caused by a disease similar to Leber congenital amaurosis was partially reversed in three Briard puppies by researchers at Cornell University and the University of Pennsylvania using gene therapy.

Characteristics 

The coat is long (no less than ), thick and harsh like that of a goat; it may be solid black, grey, blue or fawn, or fawn overlaid with black; greying is seen to a variable extent. An unusual characteristic of the breed is the double dewclaw on the hind legs; the breed standard specifies a single or absent dewclaw as a disqualifying fault.

Notes

References 

FCI breeds
Herding dogs
Dog breeds originating in France